Horsepen Creek is a  long 3rd order tributary to Reedy Fork in Guilford County, North Carolina.

History
The Battlefield of Guilford Courthouse was fought in part on the eastern edge of the Horsepen Creek watershed.

Course
Horsepen Creek rises on the East Fork Deep River divide at Piedmont Triad International Airport in Guilford County, North Carolina.  Horsepen Creek then flows northeast to meet Reedy Fork in Lake Brandt.

Watershed
Horsepen Creek drains  of area, receives about 45.0 in/year of precipitation, has a topographic wetness index of 444.82 and is about 18% forested.

References

External links
 USGS Water Gauge for Horsepen Creek at Fleming Road

Rivers of North Carolina
Rivers of Guilford County, North Carolina